The fourth season of Yu-Gi-Oh! 5D's lasts from episodes 93 to 134 (with the title Road to Destiny, in the English dub). As the WRGP begins (known as the "World Racing Grand Prix" in the English dub, while known as the "World Riding Duel Grand Prix" in the Japanese version), the 3 Emperors of Yliaster begin to make their move. The show uses seven pieces of theme music. For episodes 93 through 103, the opening theme is "Freedom" by La Vie, while the ending theme is 'O-Zone' by Vistlip. For episodes 104 to 129, the opening theme is "BELIEVE IN NEXUS" by Masaaki Endoh, while the ending theme is "Close to You" by Alvino ~Alchemy vision normal~. Certain episodes use the insert song: "Clear Mind" by Masaaki Endoh.

Yu-Gi-Oh! 5D's was licensed in North America by 4Kids Entertainment, and Seasons 4 and 5 was aired on 4Kids' Toonzai block between February 19 – September 10, 2011. However, a total of 31 episodes were left out (from Seasons 4 and 5) from the original Japanese broadcast, with the English dubbed series ending on September 10, 2011. This was due to a lawsuit from TV Tokyo.

Episode list

References

2010 Japanese television seasons
2011 Japanese television seasons
5D's (season 4)